The  class was a group of three battlecruisers ordered but not completed for the German  (Imperial Navy) in 1916. The primary change was an increase of the main battery from eight  guns to eight  weapons. Work on the first ship had already begun by the time the navy decided to re-design the ships, so the design staff was constrained by the need to use the material already assembled.

The name derived from the fact that the lead ship was intended as a replacement for the armored cruiser , lost to mines in 1914, and it had been ordered under the provisional .

As with the s, the three ships of the  class were never completed. This was primarily due to shifting wartime construction priorities; U-boats were deemed more important to Germany's war effort later in the war, and so work on other types of ships was slowed or halted outright. The lead ship, was the only vessel of the three to have begun construction, though she was over two years from completion by the time work was abandoned.

Development 

The fourth and final Naval Law, passed in 1912, governed the building program of the German Navy during World War I. The  (RMA – Imperial Naval Office) decided that to meet the requirements set in the 1912 law, the Navy should construct one battleship and one battlecruiser every year between 1913 and 1917, with an additional unit of both types in 1913 and 1916. The RMA initially believed the war would be over quickly, but by early 1915, it had become clear that it would not be the case. As a result, it made the decision to use the prescribed construction program to replace the five armored cruisers that had been sunk in the first six months of the war with new battlecruisers, rather than lay down new battleships. The last three of these new battlecruisers were ordered to replace  and the two s, the former having been sunk by German mines in November 1914 and the latter pair being sunk at the Battle of the Falkland Islands the following month. As they were considered replacements for old ships, rather than as new additions to the fleet, they were ordered under provisional names as " (replacement) [name of the ship to be replaced]".

Admiral Eduard von Capelle replaced  (Grand Admiral) Alfred von Tirpitz as the State Secretary of the RMA on 16 March 1916, which led to questions in the RMA over the three ships. Kaiser Wilhelm II wanted the next group of battlecruisers to be equipped with  guns instead of the  pieces carried by the s. On 19 April, the Construction Department submitted several design proposals, including GK1, GK2, and GK3.

 (Vice Admiral) Reinhard Scheer, the commander of the High Seas Fleet, expressed his preference for GK2, the largest and fastest of the versions (with a top speed of ), during a meeting on 29 April. Some consideration was given to the idea that the new battlecruiser design should represent a merging of the battleship and battlecruiser types—what was later termed a "fast battleship"—a concept Wilhelm II had been pushing for years. The so-called "" (large combat ship) would simplify construction and design work, but  (Rear Admiral) Georg Hebbinghaus, the head of the General Navy Department, pointed out that under the German Naval Laws, such a change would not be permitted and that the laws would need to be rewritten to allow the new type. Hebbinghaus nevertheless allowed that the design staff had some leeway in warship development that could be used to get around the legal restrictions.

In a meeting on 12 August, Hebbinghaus stated that he wanted to build ships that were similar to traditional battleship designs, preferring survivability to offensive power; he argued that the s should be cancelled in favor of this new type, since they had been designed before the navy had any war experience on which to base them. Capelle stated that the last three s—, and —and  if work had not proceeded too far along, should be reordered as a completely new design, GK6, which he submitted. Scheer objected to the decrease in speed, and for the time being, Hebbinghaus's and Capelle's proposals came to nothing. Another meeting on 24 August concluded that all seven ships of the  class would be built as designed, the General Navy Department noting that they would "still undoubtedly represent a very valuable addition to the fleet in 1919."

Hebbinghaus again raised the issue of the main battery on 31 October, since by then it had become known that the United States Navy would be building the s, rumored to be armed with  guns, and that the British were arming their s with 38 cm guns. By this time, much of the construction resources of the German Navy had been redirected to the U-boat fleet, so the new ships could not be completed before 1920; as a result, the s would be inferior to the latest American and British designs. Hebbinghaus pushed for the battlecruisers to be armed with at least 38 cm guns, but preferably 40 cm or even  guns. By that time,  had been laid down the previous November, and was too far along to be converted, leaving the last three s as the only members available to be rearmed. The Construction Department accordingly rushed to redesign the vessels to equip them with 38 cm guns, but the work was hampered by the fact that the navy had already ordered the machinery and armor plate for the ships, and work on the materials had already begun. Indeed,  had already been laid down in July.

Design
During the re-design process, Scheer requested that the new ships have increased armament, armor, and speed compared to the first four s, but owing to the constraints imposed, only the armament could be increased, and the deck armor and speed had to be reduced slightly to keep displacement in check. The length and draft were also increased to keep the ships' speed from falling too much. Since the ships' propulsion systems had already been ordered, they were kept essentially identical to the original  design, although internal rearrangements allowed the boilers to be trunked into one large funnel rather than the two of the s, which conferred several advantages. These included a significant reduction in smoke interference with the spotting tops and additional room to move the tripod mast further aft, which reduced the risk of the mast falling on the conning tower in the event of battle damage and increased the field of view from the spotting top.

General characteristics 
The -class ships were an enlargement of the previous -class ships. The ships were planned to displace  as designed and up to  fully laden. The -class ships' hulls were to have been constructed with longitudinal steel frames with the outer plating riveted on. The hulls were divided into eighteen watertight compartments. The crew of the ship was to consist of 47 officers and 1,180 sailors.

Machinery 
The ships were to have electrical power provided by diesel generators. The s were intended to mount a pair of rudders side by side for steering.

The power plant was rated  and 295 revolutions per minute, the same as the preceding -class ships. However, the areas of the hull between the torpedo bulkhead and the outer wall of the ship were also used for fuel storage.

Armament 

The -class battlecruisers were to be armed with a main battery of eight 38 cm (15 in) SK L/45 guns in four Drh LC/1913 twin-gun turrets; this was identical to the main armament carried by the s. In both designs the turrets were arranged in two superfiring pairs, one forward and the other aft. These turrets originally allowed for depression of the guns to −8 degrees and elevation to 16 degrees, though  had hers modified to allow 20 degrees of elevation, a common practice for German naval weapons during the latter part of the war. The guns had to be returned to 2.5 degrees to reload them. Each turret was fitted with a stereo rangefinder. Intended ammunition stowage for the  class was 720 shells or 90 rounds per gun; these were  shells that were light for guns of their caliber. The shell allotment was divided between armor piercing and high explosive versions, with 60 of the former and 30 of the latter. The guns had a rate of fire of around one shell every 38 seconds.

The ships' secondary battery was to have consisted of twelve  SK L/45 quick-firing guns mounted in armored casemates along the central superstructure. These guns were intended for defense against torpedo boats, and were supplied with a total of 2,240 shells. The guns had a sustained rate of fire of 5 to 7 rounds per minute. The ships were also to be equipped with eight  SK L/45 flak guns in single pedestal mounts. Four were arranged around the rear superfiring main battery turret and the other four around the forward conning tower. The guns were placed in MPL C/13 mountings, which allowed depression to −10 degrees and elevation to 70 degrees.

As was standard for warships of the period, the s were to be equipped with submerged torpedo tubes. There were three  tubes: one in the bow, and one on each flank of the ship. The ships would have been supplied with approximately fifteen torpedoes.

Armor 
The -class ships were protected with Krupp cemented steel armor, as was the standard for German warships of the period. The armor layout was identical to the preceding  class, which was itself very similar to the armor scheme on the preceding  ships. This included the ammunition magazines and the machinery spaces. The belt was reduced in less critical areas, to  forward and  aft. A  torpedo bulkhead ran the length of the hull, several meters behind the main belt.

The 15 cm guns had 150 mm worth of armor plating in the casemates; the guns themselves had  shields to protect their crews from shell splinters.

Construction and cancellation 
The contracts for the ships had originally been allocated while still members of the  class. , a replacement for the armored cruiser , was awarded to AG Vulcan in Hamburg on 10 April 1915. Work on  began with her keel laying in July 1916 under yard number 63, and the midship section of the hull had been assembled by the time the ships were redesigned.

The ships were never completed, primarily because by 1917, the shipbuilding industry had largely been diverted to support the U-boat Campaign, which had become the priority of the Navy. After 1917, work on  only took place in order to occupy dockyard workers who could not be employed on U-boat construction. The RMA filed a report dated 1 February 1918, which stated that capital ship construction had stopped, primarily due to the shifting priorities to the U-boat war. As a result, the hull frames that had been assembled were subsequently scrapped on the slipway. No work was done on  before the ships were cancelled.

Already in 1918, the design staff revived the  concept with a series of design studies that ranged from smaller counterparts to the British  of "large light cruisers" to very large,  battlecruisers armed with  guns. The design studies ultimately demonstrated that the type of ship that Scheer desired was impractical owing to the size limitations imposed by the German Navy's infrastructure, specifically the existing dry docks and the Kaiser Wilhelm Canal.

See also

 H-class battleship proposals – a series of battleship designs for Nazi Germany's Kriegsmarine that were also cancelled.

Notes

Footnotes

Citations

References

Further reading
 
 

Battlecruiser classes
Battlecruisers of the Imperial German Navy
Proposed ships of Germany
 
Cancelled ships